Indian River High School is a part of the Indian River School District, located in Dagsboro, Delaware, in southern Sussex County.

Indian River High School is one of two high schools in the district, along with Sussex Central High School in Georgetown.

Desegregation

Indian River High School remained an all-white school called John M. Clayton until 1967, long after Brown v. Board of Education.

John M. Clayton later became John M. Clayton Elementary School which is in the former building of the original school.

Alumni
Colleen Davis, the Delaware State Treasurer, graduated from Indian River in 1998.

Sandra Bruce, the acting Inspector General of the U.S. Department of Education, graduated from Indian River High School.

Athletics

The Indian River High School Indians compete in athletics in the Henlopen Conference. They are one of the smallest schools in the conference, based on enrollment, and thereby compete in the Henlopen South. The Indians have won eight state championships, with the latest coming in boys' soccer in 2020. The Indians have won two state football championships in 1988 and 2011, two state championships in basketball in 1980 and 1981, and a championship in softball in 1998.

Football
The history of the Indian River Indians football team goes as far back as 1963 with their first win in the Henlopen Conference when the school was known as John M Clayton. In 1980, the state split the schools for football into two divisions.  Indian River was placed in the Henlopen South Division in the conference and have won 16 division championships. Lead by running back #40 Kevin Mumford Joyner rushing for 4,356 yards 27 touchdowns and made All state 3yrs of his career at Indian River, and still hold the record. Indian River's last southern division title came in 1980 Joseph Dunham Class of 2001 holds State Records in Kick and Punt Return Yards as well as Touchdowns in a Season and Game. He had 7 Returns for Touchdowns against Dover High School in 2000 and a Total of 17 on the Year. Finished with 1,597 Return Yards in 2000

Football state championships
In 1988, the Indian River football team started hot, winning 9 of their 10 regular season games.  They were 6-0 in the southern division and their only loss came at Seaford who was a division one team at the time.  The team was led by quarterback Heath Hall and running back Kevin Mumford Joyner who rushed 275 yards and 3 touchdowns .  The Indians traveled to Claymont High School for their semi-final game and defeated them 34 to 19, Mumford rushed 300 yards 4 touchdowns and was MVP of the game .  The next game was for the state championship against Dickinson High School at Dover High School who came in undefeated at 11-0.  The Indians won their first championship by a score of 18-13.  They finished the season at 11-1. Kevin Mumford Joyner awarded a full  scholarship to attend and play football at Delaware State  University  Dover, Delaware.

The 2011 high school football season was a season that no one saw coming. The team was coming off two back to back 5-5 regular season records.  The Indians ran through the 2011 regular season schedule with an undefeated record.  They won every game by at least 14 points and showcased a hurry up offence that had not been seen in the state of Delaware before.  Their semi-final game was against Howard High School at IR.  They won the game 49-14.  Next came Caravel High School at Delaware State University field in Dover.  Indian River claimed the Division 2 state championship, beating Caravel 35-13.  Quarterback Jamie Jarmon had three rushing touchdowns and also intercepted two Jonathan Welch passes.  The Indians capped off a perfect season at 12-0, winning their first state title since 1988 and the second in school history.

MCJROTC
The Marine Corps Junior Reserve Officer Training Corps is one of many extracurricular activities. The Drill Team and the Rifle Team have won many awards for parades and competitions.

References

 http://www.wboc.com/story/16182583/indian-river-wins-state-championship

External links

High schools in Sussex County, Delaware
Public high schools in Delaware
1963 establishments in Delaware
Educational institutions established in 1963